The 1951–52 Minneapolis Lakers season was the fourth season for the franchise in the National Basketball Association (NBA). The NBA widened the foul lane before the 1951–52 season in an attempt to slow down George Mikan. Despite the change, it had little effect on Mikan. He still averaged 23.8 points per game, although he lost the scoring title to Paul Arizin, from the Philadelphia Warriors.
The Lakers went into the campaign with essentially the same lineup. Rochester took first place in the Western Division by a game, but the Lakers ousted the Royals in four games in the division finals. The NBA Finals would have the Lakers oppose the New York Knickerbockers.
Games 3 and 4 of the Finals were played at the 69th Regiment Armory instead of at Madison Square Garden. This was because the circus was in town. The teams split those games, and Games 5 and 6 as well. Game 7 was dominated by Minneapolis. The Lakers pounded out an 82–65 win, at home, to claim their third NBA crown in their first four seasons.

Offseason

NBA Draft

Roster

Regular season

Season standings

Record vs. opponents

Game log

Player stats
Note: GP= Games played; REB= Rebounds; AST= Assists; STL = Steals; BLK = Blocks; PTS = Points; AVG = Average

Playoffs

|- align="center" bgcolor="#ccffcc"
| 1
| March 23
| Indianapolis
| W 78–70
| George Mikan (24)
| Minneapolis Auditorium
| 1–0
|- align="center" bgcolor="#ccffcc"
| 2
| March 25
| @ Indianapolis
| W 94–87
| George Mikan (36)
| Butler Fieldhouse
| 2–0
|-

|- align="center" bgcolor="#ffcccc"
| 1
| March 29
| @ Rochester
| L 78–88
| George Mikan (47)
| Edgerton Park Arena
| 0–1
|- align="center" bgcolor="#ccffcc"
| 2
| March 30
| @ Rochester
| W 83–78 (OT)
| Vern Mikkelsen (19)
| Edgerton Park Arena
| 1–1
|- align="center" bgcolor="#ccffcc"
| 3
| April 5
| Rochester
| W 77–67
| Jim Pollard (22)
| Minneapolis Auditorium
| 2–1
|- align="center" bgcolor="#ccffcc"
| 4
| April 6
| Rochester
| W 82–80
| Saul, Mikkelsen (18)
| Minneapolis Auditorium
| 3–1
|-

|- align="center" bgcolor="#ccffcc"
| 1
| April 12
| New York
| W 83–79 (OT)
| Jim Pollard (34)
| George Mikan (16)
| Pollard, Mikan (4)
| St. Paul Auditorium8,722
| 1–0
|- align="center" bgcolor="#ffcccc"
| 2
| April 13
| New York
| L 72–80
| George Mikan (18)
| George Mikan (21)
| Slater Martin (4)
| St. Paul Auditorium
| 1–1
|- align="center" bgcolor="#ccffcc"
| 3
| April 16
| @ New York
| W 82–77
| George Mikan (26)
| George Mikan (17)
| Pep Saul (8)
| 69th Regiment Armory4,500
| 2–1
|- align="center" bgcolor="#ffcccc"
| 4
| April 18
| @ New York
| L 89–90 (OT)
| Slater Martin (32)
| George Mikan (17)
| Pep Saul (5)
| 69th Regiment Armory5,200
| 2–2
|- align="center" bgcolor="#ccffcc"
| 5
| April 20
| New York
| W 102–89
| Mikkelsen, Mikan (32)
| George Mikan (17)
| Pep Saul (5)
| St. Paul Auditorium7,244
| 3–2
|- align="center" bgcolor="#ffcccc"
| 6
| April 23
| @ New York
| L 68–76
| George Mikan (28)
| George Mikan (15)
| Slater Martin (9)
| 69th Regiment Armory3,000
| 3–3
|- align="center" bgcolor="#ccffcc"
| 7
| April 25
| New York
| W 82–65
| George Mikan (22)
| George Mikan (19)
| Slater Martin (6)
| Minneapolis Auditorium8,612
| 4–3
|-

Awards and honors
 George Mikan, All-NBA First Team
 Vern Mikkelsen, All-NBA Second Team
 Jim Pollard, All-NBA Second Team
 George Mikan, NBA All-Star Game
 Vern Mikkelsen, NBA All-Star Game
 Jim Pollard, NBA All-Star Game

References

External links
 Lakers on Database Basketball
 Lakers on Basketball Reference

Los Angeles Lakers seasons
Minneapolis Lakers seasons
NBA championship seasons
Minnesota Lakers
Minnesota Lakers